A Man Without a Soul may refer to:

"A Man Without a Soul", an early published version of Edgar Rice Burroughs's novel The Monster Men
The Man Without a Soul, a version of Edgar Rice Burroughs's novel The Mucker